Subsumption may refer to:

 A minor premise in symbolic logic (see syllogism)
 The Liskov substitution principle in object-oriented programming
 Subtyping in programming language theory
 Subsumption architecture in robotics
 A subsumption relation in category theory, semantic networks and linguistics, also known as a "hyponym-hypernym relationship" (Is-a)
 Formal and real capitalist subsumption describes different processes whereby capital comes to dominate an economic process. Coined in Karl Marx's Capital, Volume I